J. Michael "Mickey" Haller, Junior is a fictional character created by Michael Connelly in the 2005 novel The Lincoln Lawyer. Haller, a Los Angeles-based defense attorney, is the paternal half-brother of Connelly's best-known character, LAPD Detective Hieronymus "Harry" Bosch. The Mickey Haller series consists of six published novels, with the most recent published in 2020.

A film adaptation of The Lincoln Lawyer, starring Matthew McConaughey as Mickey Haller, was released in March 2011.

A television series adaptation of The Lincoln Lawyer from David E. Kelley and A+E Studios, was released on Netflix in September 2022. The first season is based on the second book in the series, while a second season based on the fourth book is set to release in 2023. Mexican actor Manuel Garcia-Rulfo stars as Mickey Haller, as the series explores the character's Latino heritage.

Character biography

Background
Haller is significantly younger than his half-brother, Bosch. When Bosch first met his father, Michael Haller Sr., Bosch was an adult but Mickey was only five years old. (However, in chapter 19 of The Black Ice, Bosch mentions just one, unnamed half-brother. Bosch notes that the half-brother is a defense attorney and “probably born a few years ahead of Bosch”.) The elder Michael Haller was one of Los Angeles' premier criminal defense attorneys and his clients included mobster Mickey Cohen and one of the Manson girls. He was born from his father's second marriage. He was born five months after his parents wed and they wed less than two months after his father divorced his first wife. Haller's mother was much younger than his father and came from Mexico where she was a famous actress, and in The Fifth Witness, Haller himself says that he looks "more south of the border than north".  Little is known of Haller's childhood other than the death of his father (which occurred shortly after the meeting with Bosch) and his inheritance of his father's Colt Woodsman pistol, mentioned in The Lincoln Lawyer. Haller followed in his father's footsteps, becoming a defense attorney. Most of Haller's knowledge of his father comes from law books he has read and stories from judges and other lawyers who had worked with the elder Haller prior to his death.

The Mickey Haller novels are narrated almost exclusively in the first-person by Mickey Haller. As such, The Crossing – although it features appearances by Mickey Haller – is a Harry Bosch novel because it is narrated entirely in the third person. By comparison, all but two of the Harry Bosch novels are narrated in the third-person. (Both Lost Light and The Narrows are narrated in the first person by the temporarily retired Harry Bosch.) The second novel featuring Mickey Haller, The Reversal, could be considered a crossover novel, as it contains both Harry Bosch-centered chapters, narrated in the third person (including third-person scenes featuring Mickey Haller) and Mickey Haller-centered chapters, narrated in the first person.

As of 2020, there are six novels in The Lincoln Lawyer series. The latest is The Law of Innocence, which is narrated from Haller's point of view.

Personal life
Haller has been married and divorced twice, once to Maggie McPherson and once to Lorna Taylor. McPherson, with whom he has a daughter, Hayley, is a career prosecutor with the Los Angeles County District Attorney's Office, and is nicknamed "McFierce" by defense lawyers. They divorced due to their opposite careers—Haller was defending accused criminals, while McPherson was prosecuting them.  They have continued to maintain a close relationship, with periodic reconciliations.  Taylor is currently Haller's Case Manager and is married to Haller's current investigator, Dennis "Cisco" Wojciechowski.  Haller maintains good relationships with both of his ex-wives and has joint custody of his daughter.  In The Brass Verdict, Haller is revealed to have visitation of his daughter on Wednesday nights and alternate weekends.  By the events of The Fifth Witness, however, Haller reveals that is only the "official arrangement" and he sees his daughter far more frequently.

During the series Haller has used two private investigators for his trials. The first, Raul "Mish" Levin was murdered during the events of The Lincoln Lawyer, his nickname "Mish" was bestowed upon him by Haller after Haller learned of his "mish-mash" of Mexican-Jewish ancestry. His second investigator, Wojciechowski, was formerly a member of the motorcycle gang The Road Saints, whom Haller frequently represented, and was nicknamed by the gang after the Cisco Kid, an outlaw-adventurer Wild West character created by O. Henry in 1907.  Cisco was introduced in The Brass Verdict.

Haller was nicknamed "the Lincoln Lawyer" because of his preference for working out of his Lincoln Town Car instead of in an office.  However, during The Fifth Witness, Haller temporarily rents an office on a one-year lease.  With the influx in foreclosure clients at that time, Haller has hired an associate, Jennifer "Bullocks" Aronson, a new graduate of Southwestern Law School, which is located in the former Bullocks Wilshire.

In Nine Dragons, Haller makes a short cameo as Harry Bosch's lawyer; a murder suspect even states that Matthew McConaughey was his alibi. He later suggests that their daughters (Harry's Maddie and Mickey's Hayley) should get together; their daughters would later meet during the events of The Reversal. Later on in the book, a reference is made to the movie adaptation of The Lincoln Lawyer starring Matthew McConaughey.

Haller's discomfort with representing the guilty is a constant theme in the series, and he has twice attempted to move to the prosecution side. In The Reversal, Haller is appointed as a special prosecutor to overturn the exoneration of Jason Jessup, a convicted child-murderer who was freed after DNA evidence cleared him of wrongdoing. Haller teams up with McPherson and Bosch to retry Jessup.  At the end of The Fifth Witness, Haller files to run for Los Angeles County district attorney, with McPherson's support. At the beginning of The Gods of Guilt, however, it is described that his campaign turned into disaster when the client whom he got acquitted for drunk driving does the same thing again, killing a mother and her daughter, the latter being a classmate of Haller's daughter who then refuses to talk to him for most of the book.

Novel series

Film and television

Box office performance

References

Book series introduced in 2005
Fictional characters from Los Angeles
Fictional lawyers
Fictional American lawyers
Michael Connelly characters
Characters in American novels of the 21st century
Literary characters introduced in 2005
Male characters in literature
Male characters in film